Arnell Creek is a  long 1st order tributary to Love Creek, in Sussex County, Delaware.

Variant names
According to the Geographic Names Information System, it has also been known historically as:  
Arnells Creek
Arnold Creek

Course
Arnell Creek rises on the Munchy Branch divide at Breezewood in Sussex County, Delaware.  Arnell Creek then flows south-southeast to meet Love Creek at Robinson Landing.

Watershed
Arnell Creek drains  of area, receives about 45.3 in/year of precipitation, has a topographic wetness index of 547.46 and is about 8.0% forested.

See also
List of rivers of Delaware

References 

Rivers of Delaware